Taleh is a historical town in the eastern Sool region of Somaliland. As of September 2015, both Puntland and Somaliland had nominal influence or control in Taleh and it's vicinity. The town served as the capital of the pre-independence Dervish movement.

The Dalyare fort and the Taleh complex built between 1909 and 1910 are among the least disfigured Dervish era structures that remain in Sool province, whom altogether comprise 27 Dervish era structures. The oldest or first of these forts was the Ugaadhyahan Dhulbahante-inhabited fort at Halin and destroyed by Eric Swayne in 1902; the second-oldest was the Bah Ali Gheri Dhulbahante-inhabited fort at Eyl built in 1903.

Taleh succeeded the city of Eyl (Illig) as the Dervish capital for four years from 1905 onwards. According to the concurrent London Gazette, Taleh and Jidali were the two main Dhulbahante garesas inhabited by Dervish.

History

Dervish State

Dhulbahante garesa
In the Dervish-written letter's description of the fall of Taleh in February 1920, in an April 1920 letter transcribed from the original Arabic script into Italian by the incumbent Governatori della Somalia, the various Dervish-built installations are described as garesas taken from the Dhulbahante clan by the British:

The Mogadishu governor was later inspired to similarly refer to his resident mansion as a garesa.

Choice as capital

According to Dervish veteran Ciise Faarax Fikad, Taleh was chosen as the Dervish capital because the Nugaal Valley lies at the heartland of Dhulbahante territory, its distance from colonial administrative centers and to generate geographical distance from the hostile bodies such as Rayid signatories to British treaties, the Majeerteen, those under Mohamoud Ali Shire and the Ogaden who were in general opposed to the Dervish:

Colonial sources concur with Somali sources that non-Dhulbahante clans were hostile towards the Dervish:

Dervish forts/Dhulbahante garesas

Taleh is home to several historic structures dating to the Dervish era. Of these, there are five forts erected by Mohammed Abdullah Hassan's former Dervish movement in present-day Sool and Sanaag. Constructed between 1901 and 1915, most of the edifices are concentrated in the Sanaag & Sool region, including Dalyare fort, Jidali fort, Midhisho, Shimbir Bariis and Badhan. Taleh/Taleex is the largest of the structures.  According to Cabdi-Yaar Cali Guuleed, a Dervish veteran, the largest Dhulbahante fort from the Dervish era is the Dhulbahante fort of Taleh which according to him was built between 1909 and 1910 and he said the following:

It was built around a collection of Dervish tombs, the earliest of which belongs to Sultan Nur Ahmed Aman and Carro Seed Magan, the mother of the emir of Diiriye Guure, i.e. the Sayid. From 1909 to 1910, the Dervish constructed the main fort around the older tombs. They spent the next two years in the mountainous regions of Sanaag building three more smaller forts.

Maxamuud Xoosh Cigaal was the last Dervish man to be resident at the Taleh fort, whilst the six-year old Jaamac Biixi Kidin was the last Dervish person in the fort overall.

A 1931 diary-book by former governor of Italian Somaliland Francesco Caroselli notes an April 1920 letter by the Sayid to the then Italian-Somalia governor which states the Taleh fort was one of 27 forts built by Dervish and that they're called Dhulbahante garesas.

Fall of Taleh

In 1919–1920, the British Royal Air Force (RAF) bombarded the Sanaag forts, where most of the Dervish had operated since 1913. Having destroyed the structures and driven out Mohammed Abdullah Hassan's men to Taleh in 1920, they finally attacked the town, assisted by horsemen and Somali personalities. The settlement was bombarded by the Royal Air Force on 4 February and taken days later, with the British having defeated the last pockets of Dervish resistance. Among the casualties at Taleh were Ibrahim Buqul and Haji Sudi, two of the closest men to the Mullah and both being of the Adan Madobe sub-division of the Habr Je'lo. The former was the commander of the Dervish at Taleh, and the latter was a long-standing member of the movement according to Douglas Jardin (1923) and Henry Rayne (1921). Another Dervish leader, Yusuf Xayle, was captured alive and later executed by former Dervish Abdi Dhere, who had defected to the opposition in 1919. Muhammad Abdullah Hassan himself managed to escape to the Ogaden, where his Dervishes were later routed in a 1921 raid led by the clan leader Haji Warabe.

After the Somali civil war
At the beginning of the Somali civil war, the Sool region was in a drought, and the area around Taleh was particularly affected. Local nomads lost much of their assets and migrated to nearby cities such as Las Anod.

In 2009, women reportedly have no voting or suffrage rights in Taleh at this time.

In March 2011, elders of Taleh resolved to call for the withdrawal of Somaliland troops from Sool. On December 26, 2011, an SSC meeting was held in Taleh, attended by elder Haji Abdikarim Hussein and others.

In August 2011, fighting between Somaliland and Puntland forces occurred in Taleh, with at least 3 killed and 7 wounded.

In January 2012, Somaliland police arrested a reporter from Universal TV in Las Anod who broadcast news about the Taleh clan meeting for allegedly distorting the content of the meeting.

Conflict between Somaliland and Khatumo
In January 2012, the Dhulbahante clan proclaimed the independence of Khatumo State with Taleh as its capital. However, this was not recognized internationally, nor by neighboring countries Somaliland and Puntland.

In November 2012, Somaliland municipal elections were held, but voting did not take place in Taleh for security reasons.

In November 2013, there were clashes between Puntland and Khatumo forces, which also killed several civilians. Many of Taleh's residents were evacuated to nearby neighborhoods. Epidemics of diarrhea, pneumonia, and other diseases occurred in evacuated areas.

In mid-April 2014, Somaliland sent hundreds of troops to occupy Taleh, the main town in Khatumo. The Special Representative of the UN Secretary-General for Somali Affairs, Nicholas Kay, expressed concern about the conflict between Somaliland and Puntland and urged mediation by the United Nations Assistance Mission in Somalia (UNSOM). Somaliland troops withdrew one day after occupation.

In June 2014, Somaliland also temporarily occupied Taleh.

In April 2015, five people were injured in a confrontation between the Samakab Ali and Farah Ali clans in Taleh.

In December 2015, the Somaliland government granted a foreign company a permit to conduct oil exploration in the Sool region, and when that company conducted oil exploration in Taleh and Hudun, Puntland condemned this as a provocation by Somaliland.

In May 2016, Puntland's Minister of Insurance visited Taleh to lay the cornerstone for the birth center.

In December 2016, the region was in drought and a delegation, including Somaliland's Interior Minister, has visited several towns in the Sool region, including Taleh, to survey the drought situation.

In 2017, the Puntland President Abdiweli Gaas appointed Mohamed Roble Isse as Taleh District Commissioner.

The 2017 Somaliland presidential election saw Taleh become a constituency for the first time.

In June 2018, a SOMNEWS TV reporter was arrested by Somaliland police for reporting on a press conference held by elders in the Taleh district.

In April 2019, Somaliland forces and pro-Somaliland militias took control of the Taleh district. Khatumo forces withdrew without fighting.

In April 2019, diarrhea symptoms caused by water shortage occurred in Taleh. Taleh has no hospital and is coping with traditional home remedies, with some patients being taken to Las Anod, which is dominated by Somaliland, and others to Garoowe, the capital of Puntland.

Policies by Somaliland
In December 2019, Somaliland's Minister of Information visited Taleh.

In January 2021, the Somaliland government begins voter registration for municipal elections and parliamentary election in Sool region, including Taleh. One polling station was set up in the Taleh area, and the distribution of ballots was scheduled for three days until March 15, but a one-week postponement was announced. In June, preliminary results from the regional parliaments were announced and Kulmiye 6, Wadani 3, UCID 0 are selected in Taleh.

Silsilad

Conception 
The notion of the building of fortresses for Dervish inhabitation pre-existed 1902 as Eric Swayne encountered a fort at Halin during the second expedition in 1902, as such, arguably timeframing the building of the Halin fort at 1901. The British War Office stated that Eric Swayne destroyed the fort in 1902, and that it was inhabited by the Ugaadhyahan Dhulbahante subclans of Naleye Ahmed and Nur Ahmed:

The second-oldest Dhulbahante fort of the Dervish era is the Dhowre Sheneeleh fort which was constructed at Eyl (Illig) in 1903. According to the British War Office, the castle at Illig was exclusively inhabited by the Dhulbahante clan, and in particular by the Bah Ali Gheri subclan of the Dhulbahante:

Historian Douglas Jardine concurs with the British War Office that the Dervish capital at Illig (Eyl) was exclusively inhabited by the Dhulbahante:

Human habitation
Although the term Taleh or Taleex is often used to describe the entire Dervish fort complex in the town, it more strictly applies to only one of the structures in a four-part compound. The latter complex includes Falat, Silsilad, Dar Ilaalo and Taleh.

According to Jardine, prior to Taleh becoming Dervish capital, the Dervish capital had for four years from 1905 onwards been at Eyl, also known as Illig:

Horse stable
Besides the human habitation, Silsilad also had a horse stable whose substance commonly features in Somali popular culture:

Like other poems, horses as a symbol of love can also eruptly turn to belligerence:

One Dervish war tactic was hit-and-run, exemplified by dispersion in all directions:

Counter-tactics used by colonial forces were dehydrating when blocking Dervish horses' access to wells:

Dervish subdivided their horses into Barroor, a beige color, and Xamar, a chest-nut colored horse, alternating each depending on the intensity of the sun or heat. The largest Dervish horse stableyard outside Taleh was arguably Damot, also called Docmo, with large assemblages reported between 1900 and 1903.

Notable horses included Shan-maray, owned by Gaanni Gaalleef Cali Xaad which was the fastest horse in the Nugaal, Isxal was the main stallion used for breeding Dervish-owned horses,

Demographics
The town of Taleh has a total population of 4,374 residents.

Climate

Education
Taleh has a number of academic institutions. According to the Somaliland Ministry of Education, there are eight primary schools in the Taleh District. Among these are Kalad, Labas, Aroley and Halin.

Notable residents
Abdisamad Ali Shire – former Vice President of Puntland
Abdihakim Abdullahi Haji Omar –  current Vice President of Puntland
Saado Ali Warsame – a Somali singer-songwriter and former politician

Notes

References

Taleex

Populated places in Sool, Somaliland